Sigitas Kučinskas (born 11 March 1963) is a Lithuanian rower. He competed in the men's coxed four event at the 1988 Summer Olympics.

References

External links
 

1963 births
Living people
People from Raseiniai District Municipality
Lithuanian male rowers
Olympic rowers of the Soviet Union
Rowers at the 1988 Summer Olympics
Honoured Masters of Sport of the USSR